Edward M. Hirsch (born January 20, 1950) is an American poet and critic who wrote a national bestseller  about reading poetry. He has published nine books of poems, including The Living Fire: New and Selected Poems (2010), which brings together thirty-five years of work, and Gabriel: A Poem (2014), a book-length elegy for his son that The New Yorker called "a masterpiece of sorrow." He has also published five prose books about poetry. He is president of the John Simon Guggenheim Memorial Foundation in New York City.

Life

Hirsch was born in Chicago. He had a childhood involvement with poetry, which he later explored at Grinnell College and the University of Pennsylvania, where he received a PhD in folklore.

Hirsch was a professor of English at Wayne State University.  In 1985, he joined the faculty at the University of Houston, where he spent 17 years as a professor in the Creative Writing Program and Department of English.  He was appointed the fourth president of the John Simon Guggenheim Foundation on September 3, 2002.  He holds seven honorary degrees.

Career
Hirsch is a well-known advocate for poetry whose essays have been published in the American Poetry Review, The New York Times Book Review, The New York Review of Books, and elsewhere.  He wrote a weekly column on poetry for The Washington Post Book World from 2002-2005, which resulted in his book Poet’s Choice (2006).  His other prose books include Responsive Reading (1999), The Demon and the Angel: Searching for the Source of Artistic Inspiration (2002), and A Poet's Glossary (2014), a complete compendium of poetic terms.  He is the editor of Transforming Vision: Writers on Art (1994), Theodore Roethke’s Selected Poems (2005) and To a Nightingale (2007).  He is the co-editor of A William Maxwell Portrait: Memories and Appreciations and The Making of a Sonnet: A Norton Anthology (2008).  He also edits the series "The Writer’s World" (Trinity University Press).

Hirsch's first collection of poems, For the Sleepwalkers, received the Lavan Younger Poets Award from the Academy of American Poets and the Delmore Schwartz Memorial Award from New York University.  His second book, Wild Gratitude, received the National Book Critics Circle Award in 1986.  He was awarded a Guggenheim Fellowship in 1985 and a five-year MacArthur Fellowship in 1997.  He received the William Riley Parker Prize from the Modern Language Association for the best scholarly essay in PMLA for the year 1991.  He has also received an Ingram Merrill Foundation Award, a National Endowment for the Arts Fellowship, the Rome Prize from the American Academy in Rome, a Pablo Neruda Presidential Medal of Honor, and the American Academy of Arts and Letters Award for Literature.  He is a former Chancellor of the Academy of American Poets. Hirsch's book, How to Read a Poem and Fall in Love with Poetry (1999), was a surprise bestseller and is widely taught throughout the country.

Works

Poetry collections
For the Sleepwalkers, (New York: Alfred A. Knopf, 1981)
Wild Gratitude, (New York: Alfred A. Knopf, 1986)
The Night Parade, (New York: Alfred A. Knopf, 1989)
Earthly Measures, (New York: Alfred A. Knopf, 1994) 
On Love, (New York: Alfred A. Knopf, 1998)
Lay Back the Darkness (New York: Alfred A. Knopf, 2003) 
Special Orders (New York: Alfred A. Knopf, 2008) 
The Living Fire : New And Selected Poems (New York: Alfred A. Knopf, 2010) 
Gabriel: A Poem (New York: Alfred A. Knopf, 2014) 
Stranger By Night (New York: Alfred A. Knopf, 2020)

Non-fiction books
 Transforming Vision: Writers on Art, Selected and Introduced by Edward Hirsch, (Boston: Little, Brown, 1994) 
How to Read a Poem and Fall in Love with Poetry, (New York: Harcourt Brace, 1999) 
Responsive Reading, (1999)
'Introduction' in John Keats, Complete Poems and Selected Letters of John Keats, (New York: Modern Library, 2001) 
The Demon and the Angel: Searching for the Source of Artistic Expression, (New York: Harcourt Brace, 2002)
Poet's Choice, (New York: Harcourt, 2006) 
A Poet's Glossary, (Boston & New York: Houghton Mifflin Harcourt, 2014) 
 100 Poems To Break Your Heart, (New York: HarperCollins Publishers, 2021) 
The Heart of American Poetry, (Library of America, 2022)

Editor
Transforming Vision: Writers on Art, (The Art Institute of Chicago/ Bulfinch Press, 1994) 
A William Maxwell Portrait, (Norton, 2004) 
Theodore Roethke: Selected Poems, (The Library of America, 2005) 
Irish Writers on Writing, edited with Eavan Boland, (Trinity University Press, 2007) 
Polish Writers on Writing, edited with Adam Zagajewski, (Trinity University Press, 2007) 
To a Nightingale: Poems from Sappho to Borges, (Braziller, 2007) 
The Making of a Sonnet, (Norton, 2008) 
Hebrew Writers on Writing, edited with Peter Cole (Trinity University Press, 2008) 
Nineteenth-Century American Writers on Writing, edited with Brenda Wineapple (Trinity University Press, 2010) 
Chinese Writers on Writing, edited with Arthur Sze (Trinity University Press, 2010) 
Romanian Writers on Writing, edited with Norman Manea, (Trinity University Press, 2011) 
100 Poems To Break Your Heart, (Boston: Houghton Mifflin Harcourt, 2021)

References

External links

Edward Hirsch website
Edward M. Hirsch, Guggenheim Fellow in Poetry, 1985. Profile.
Interview with Ramona Koval, The Book Show ABC Radio National, on "The Living Fire", 5 May 2010. Audio and transcript
Edward Hirsch profile and poems on Poets.org
Interview with Edward Hirsch at Nashville Review
To Go Its Way in Tears: Poems of Grief a collection edited by Hirsch
Benjamin Seaman, 'A Conversation With Stuart Dybek and Edward Hirsch' at Artful Dodge
University of Houston faculty profile
Poetry Foundation profile, biography,poem examples,articles and book extracts

1950 births
Living people
Grinnell College alumni
MacArthur Fellows
American male poets
University of Pennsylvania alumni
University of Houston faculty
Watson Fellows
20th-century American poets
Poets from Illinois
Writers from Chicago
20th-century American male writers
20th-century American non-fiction writers
21st-century American poets
21st-century American non-fiction writers
21st-century American male writers
Members of the American Academy of Arts and Letters